Anagnostis Petimezas (1765-1822) was a Greek revolutionary leader during the Greek War of Independence.

He was born in 1765 in Soudena near Kalavryta and was descended from the Petmezades family.  He was the son of Sotiris, brother of Athanasios which he  in Voussoka.  He took part in the battles of Kalavryta, Acrocorinth, Tripoli where he was a mandate of Theodoros Kolokotronis, etc.

He was assassinated with his son Sotiris in a Turkish ambush at Vasiliko near Sikyona and Corinth in 1822 as he was on his way to fight against Dramali Pasha.

References
''This article is translated and is based from the article at the Greek Wikipedia (el:Main Page)

1765 births
1824 deaths
Date of birth unknown
Date of death unknown
Greek military leaders of the Greek War of Independence
Anagnostis
People from Kalavryta